Acrobasis automorpha is a species of snout moth in the genus Acrobasis. It was described by Edward Meyrick in 1886. It is found on New Guinea.

References

Moths described in 1886
Acrobasis
Moths of Asia